Matthew Lorenzo is a British television presenter and film producer who has worked for Sky, BBC, ITV, Channel Four and GMTV. He is the son of the late former BBC and ITV sports commentator and journalist Peter Lorenzo.

Broadcasting career
Lorenzo was the first sports presenter to appear on Sky TV when it launched in 1989, after a career in newspapers, BBC TV and BBC Radio. He then moved to ITV to present sport on London Tonight before launching ITV Sport's Champions League coverage in 1993. He became the youngest-ever anchor of a networked World Cup in 1994. Later that year he signed with GMTV to host the Newshour daily for three years before returning to Sky Sports,. Since then he has hosted football and cricket games, worked with Bernie Ecclestone as anchor of Sky's F1 Digital + service and hosted the Sky Sports News breakfast show. He later launched the Times and Sunday Times' online football service.

Other interests
From 2013 to 2016 he produced the cinema feature "Bobby," which examines the life story of footballer Bobby Moore. It was the first film to be premiered on the pitch at Wembley Stadium - in May 2016 - as part of the celebrations surrounding the 50th anniversary of England's only World Cup win. "Bobby" received universally good reviews - "A must see film" - Evening Standard; "Moving and Revealing,"- The Times; "Excellent, a fitting tribute to a sporting hero," - Talksport; and the film received a rare 100 per cent rating from the movie review site Rotten Tomatoes.

Lorenzo was Executive Producer on the award-winning Bobby Robson: More Than a Manager. He produced "The United Way with Eric Cantona" which premiered on Sky Documentaries in May 2021 and has been nominated for Sports Documentary of the Year, Broadcast Sports Awards, 2021.

References

British television presenters
Living people
GMTV presenters and reporters
Year of birth missing (living people)